João Victor da Vitória Fernandes (born 9 January 1997), commonly known as Capixaba, is a Brazilian professional footballer who plays as a forward for J1 League club Cerezo Osaka.

Club career
Born in Guarapari, Espírito Santo, Capixaba joined Atlético Mineiro's youth setup in 2013. He made his professional debut on 2 April 2016, in a 7–2 Campeonato Mineiro win over Villa Nova.

Starting from 2017, he had a series of loan spells at various clubs, most notably at Vila Nova in 2019, with 39 appearances and two goals, and at Juventude between 2020 and 2021, appearing 31 times, scoring thrice and helping them to a third-place finish in the 2020 Campeonato Brasileiro Série B, which meant to the club a return to the top division after a 14-year absence. In February 2021, he joined Juventude on a permanent basis.

On 8 January 2022, Capixaba officially joined Japanese side Cerezo Osaka on a permanent deal.

References

External links

1997 births
Living people
Sportspeople from Espírito Santo
Brazilian footballers
Association football forwards
Expatriate footballers in Japan
Brazilian expatriate sportspeople in Japan
Campeonato Brasileiro Série A players
Campeonato Brasileiro Série B players
Clube Atlético Mineiro players
Associação Ferroviária de Esportes players
América Futebol Clube (MG) players
Associação Chapecoense de Futebol players
Vila Nova Futebol Clube players
Grêmio Novorizontino players
Coimbra Esporte Clube players
Esporte Clube Juventude players
Cerezo Osaka players